Holmside Hall Wind Farm is a wind farm near Stanley, County Durham, England. Owned and operated by E.ON UK, the farm has a nameplate capacity of 5.5MW, containing two NM80 turbines each rated at 2.75 MW.

At the time of construction, which was delayed due to high winds, the turbines were the largest and most powerful in the UK.

References

Wind farms in England
Power stations in North East England
E.ON